Jeremy Maurice Jacobs Jr. (born August 22, 1962) is an American businessman who serves as the co-chief executive officer of Delaware North and an alternate governor for the Boston Bruins.

Early life and education
Jacobs was born in Buffalo, New York, the son of billionaire businessman Jeremy Jacobs. After graduating from Nichols School in 1981, Jacobs earned an undergraduate degree from Georgetown University in 1985. He serves as an alumni admissions interviewer. Jacobs received an MBA from the Wharton School of Business at the University of Pennsylvania.

Career 
Jacobs joined Delaware North in 1989. He was named chairman of the Sportservice Division in 1995. In this role, he helped expand the company's sports holdings. He won contracts with teams & venues like the St. Louis Cardinals, the Chicago Bears, and Wembley Stadium in London. In 2001, Jacobs was named to Sports Business Journal's "Forty Under 40" list in recognition of his significant contributions to the industry. His brothers, Lou and Charlie joined him on the list in 2003 and 2009, respectively.

On January 6, 2015 Delaware North chairman Jeremy Jacobs Sr. relinquished the title of CEO and named Jerry Jacobs Jr., along with his brother Louis Jacobs, co-heads of the company.

Jacobs serves on the Georgetown University Board of Regents and the Nichols School board of trustees. He serves on the United Way's advisory board.

In 2014, Jacobs was appointed to the United States Department of Commerce's Travel and Tourism Advisory Board by Secretary Penny Pritzker. The Travel and Tourism Advisory Board advises the secretary of commerce on travel and tourism policy and infrastructure. Jacobs also serves on US Travel Insurance Association's CEO Roundtable.

Personal life
In 1990, Jacobs married Alice Carroll French, an attorney, in a Presbyterian ceremony. Jacobs' brother, Charlie Jacobs, is the CEO of Delaware North. A cousin, Chris Jacobs is a politician who served as a member of the New York State Senate, Secretary of State of New York, and County Clerk of Erie County.

References

1962 births
Living people
American people of Polish-Jewish descent
Boston Bruins executives
Businesspeople from Buffalo, New York
Georgetown University alumni